Robert Bryan Sloan Jr. (born 1949) is an American academic and theologian. He has been the president of Houston Baptist University since 2006.

Education and background
Sloan was born in Coleman, Texas, and grew up in Abilene, Texas. He earned his B.A. from Baylor University in 1970, and his M.Div from Princeton Theological Seminary in 1973. After post-graduate research at the University of Bristol, he earned his D.Th., the Doktor der Theologie degree, from the University of Basel, Switzerland, in 1978. After serving as an adjunct at Hardin-Simmons University and on the faculty of Southwestern Baptist Theological Seminary, Sloan joined the Department of Religion faculty at Baylor University in 1983, and would eventually become the founding dean of the George W. Truett Theological Seminary. He succeeded Herbert H. Reynolds as president of the university in 1995.

Baylor 2012
In 2002, Sloan unveiled a 42-page plan titled "Baylor 2012," outlining his strategy to transform into a national university with Ph.D. programs and research professors, allowing it "to enter the top tier of American universities while reaffirming and deepening its distinctive Christian mission." His plan included twelve imperatives that were "necessary for Baylor to fulfill the Vision". Opposition to the plan, as well as several controversial financial moves, resulted in Sloan narrowly escaping a 2004 vote to oust him as president, and eventually resigning in 2005. The saga is chronicled in the 2007 book The Baylor Project: Taking Christian Higher Education to the Next Level.

Houston Baptist University: The Ten Pillars
Following a brief stint as Baylor's Chancellor in 2005–2006, Sloan served as visiting scholar at the University of St Andrews in 2006,  before beginning his tenure as president of Houston Baptist University on September 1, 2006.
 		
In 2008 Sloan, along with the board of trustees, approved a 12-year vision document titled "The Ten Pillars: Faith and Reason in a Great City". The purpose of this plan is to enable the university to "fulfill its responsibility for the renewal of Christian Higher Education."

Other roles
Sloan serves on the board of directors for the Houston Symphony and the Greater Houston Partnership in addition to leadership roles on the boards of Memorial Hermann Healthcare Systems - Community Relations, Houston Christian High School, Market Place Chaplains USA, and Orphan Outreach. He is also the publisher of the academic journal, The City. Sloan published his first young adult fantasy book in 2016 and its sequel in February 2017.
 		
Sloan has pastored churches throughout Texas and beyond.  He has also held membership in the Society of Biblical Literature, the Southwestern Baptist Theological Seminary, the National Association of Baptist Professors of Religion, and Studiorum Novi Testamenti Societas.

Publications
Perspectives on John: methods and interpretation in the Fourth Gospel, with Mikeal C. Parsons (1993), 
Foundations for Biblical Interpretation: A Complete Library of Tools and Resources, with David S. Dockery and Kenneth A. Mathews (1994), 
Romans: Good News for a Troubled World, with Harry Lucenay and Bob Campbell (2000), 
Hamelin Stoop: The Eagle, the Cave, and the Footbridge 
Hamelin Stoop: The Lost Princess and the Jewel of Periluna

See also
 Baylor University basketball scandal

References

External links
Baylor 2012
HBU Bio

Alumni of the University of Bristol
Living people
1949 births
Baptists from Texas
Baylor University alumni
Princeton Theological Seminary alumni
Presidents of Baylor University
Houston Christian University
American expatriates in the United Kingdom